was a Japanese film director and scriptwriter. He directed 115 movies, wrote 101 screenplays, and is credited with the original story for five films. In addition, he worked with all six major Japanese film production companies.

His film work extended to Hong Kong, and he did the technical guidance for movies there from 1966 to 1970.

Filmography 
Filmography of Umetsugu Inoue include:

Director 
 Jazz on Parade 1954 nen: Tokyo Cinderella Musume (1954)
 Mittsu no Kao (1955) a.k.a. Three Faces
 Midori haruka ni (1955) a.k.a. The Green Music Box
 Hi no Tori (1956)
 Nikoyon Monogatari (1956)
 Shi no Jūjiro (1956)
 Man Who Causes a Storm (1957)
 Shorisha (1957)
 Washi to Taka (1957)
 Arashi o Yobu yūjō (1959) a.k.a. A Friendship That Causes a Storm
 Ashita wa Ashita no Kaze ga Fuku (1958)
 Subarashiki dansei (1958)
 Yoru no kiba (1958)
 Arashi o Yobu Gakudan (1960)
 The Poem of the Blue Star (1960)
 Shōri to Haiboku (1960)
 Six Suspects (1960)
 Gonin no Totsugeki Tai (1961)
 The Man from the East (1961)
 Heiten Jikan (1962) a.k.a. Closing
 Hell's Kitchen (1962)
 Hoseki Dorobo (1962)
 Kurotokage (1962) a.k.a. Black Lizard
 Ankokugai Saidai no Kettō (1963) a.k.a. Duel of the Underworld (暗黒街最大の決闘)
 Bury Me Deep (1963)
 Daisanno Kagemusha (1963)
 The Night I Want to Dance (1963)
 Yakuza no Kunsho (1963)
 Ankokugai Odori (1964)
 Modae (1964)
 Gyangu Chōjō Sakusen (1965)
 Kuroi Yuwaku (1965)
 Yoru no Nettaigyo (1965) a.k.a. BGS of Ginza
 1966 Koi to Namida no Taiyō 
 1967 Gekijo no Chibusa 
 1967 Hong Kong Nocturne - Director, screenwriter. 
 1967 King Drummer 
 1967  - Director, screenwriter. 
 1968 The Brain-Stealers 
 1968 Hong Kong Rhapsody 
 Kushiro no Yoru (1968)
 Long Live Youth! (1969)
 The Millionaire Chase (1969)
 1970 Apartment for Ladies 
  (1970)
 The Performers (1970)
 Whose Baby Is in the Classroom? (1970)
 Young Lovers (1970)
 The Yellow Muffler (1971)
 Lill, My Darling Witch (1971)
 Sunset (1971)
  (1971)
  (1971)
 Ikare Doku Hebi: Moku Gekisha o Kese (1976) a.k.a. Cobra
 Utareru Mae ni Ute! (1976)
 Aitsu to Lullaby (1983)
 Man Who Causes a Storm (1983)

Sources:

Screenplays 
 Mōjū tsukai no shōjo (1952)

Sources:

References

External links 
 INOUE UMETSUGU at hkcinemamagic.com 
 Inoue Umetsugu at hkmdb.com

1923 births
2010 deaths
Hong Kong film directors
Japanese film directors
People from Kyoto